Orla Reinhardt Møller (7 May 1916 – 14 February 1979) was a Danish priest and politician who served in different cabinet posts in the 1960s and 1970s. He was a member of the Social Democrats and of the Parliament between 1964 and 1977.

Early life
Møller was born in Feldballe, Mols, on 7 May 1916. He was educated as a priest. In 1951 he became general secretary of the Christian Association for Young Men and Women.

Career
From 1956 and 1965 Møller worked as a parish priest in Hasseris, North Jutland. In 1964 he was elected to the Parliament for the Social Democrats and served there until 1977. He was the minister of ecclesiastes affairs in Prime Minister Jens Otto Krag's second cabinet between 28 November 1966 and 2 February 1968. From 1971 to 1973 he was the political spokesman and chairman of the Social Democrats' parliamentary group.

On 27 September 1973 he was named as the minister of justice to the first cabinet of Anker Jørgensen. He was in office until 19 December 1973. On 13 February 1975 Møller was appointed the minister of defense and justice in the second cabinet of Anker Jørgensen. On 1 October 1977 Møller resigned from the office due to the media reports about his private life. In January 1978 he began to work as the director of NATO's Information Office in Brussels.

Personal life and death
Møller married twice. He first married in 1940. After divorcing his first wife on 7 January 1978 he married Winnie Lorentzen who would become a member of the Parliament. He died on 14 February 1979.

References

External links

1916 births
1979 deaths
Members of the Folketing 1968–1971
Danish Defence Ministers
Danish Justice Ministers
Danish Ministers for Ecclesiastical Affairs
Social Democrats (Denmark) politicians
Danish priests
Members of the Folketing 1971–1973
Members of the Folketing 1973–1975
Members of the Folketing 1975–1977
People from Syddjurs Municipality